The 1980 South American Championships was a men's tennis tournament held in Buenos Aires, Argentina that was part of the 1980 Volvo Grand Prix. The event was played on outdoor clay courts and was held from 17 November though 23 November 1980. José Luis Clerc won the singles title.

Finals

Singles

 José Luis Clerc defeated  Rolf Gehring 6–7, 2–6, 7–5, 6–0, 6–3
 It was Clerc's 6th title of the year and the 10th of his career.

Doubles
 Hans Gildemeister /  Andrés Gómez defeated  Ángel Giménez /  Jairo Velasco, Sr. 6–4, 7–5

References

External links
 ATP tournament profile

South American Championships
South American Championships (Tennis), 1980
ATP Buenos Aires
November 1980 sports events in South America